Athena Salman (born 1989) is an American politician and activist serving as a member of the Arizona House of Representatives from the 8th district since 2017.

Early life and education
Athena Salman was born in Phoenix, Arizona. Her family has roots in Mexico, Germany, and the West Bank. Salman led community service projects during her youth. In college, she was an organizing intern and senior fellow with the Arizona Students’ Association. She graduated magna cum laude from Arizona State University with degrees in economics and political science.

Career

In 2016, Salman defeated incumbent Celeste Plumlee and Michael Martinez in the District 26 Democratic primary. Salman defeated Republican Steven Adkins and Green party candidate Cara Trujillo in the general election. In 2018, Salman defeated Republican Ray Speakman in the general election. In both elections, Salman ran as a Clean Election Candidate and received no PAC contributions.

Salman, an atheist, made national headlines during her first legislative session when she gave a humanist prayer on the House floor, which was ruled out of order by the Speaker of the Arizona House of Representatives.

In 2018, Salman's legislation to provide unlimited feminine hygiene products to incarcerated women was heard in an all-male committee. As a result, a viral campaign to pressure immediate change ensued leading to a policy change by the Arizona Department of Corrections that increased the allotment of pads and for the first time included tampons.

Salman was one of nine women to come forward with sexual harassment allegations against former Arizona House of Representatives member Don Shooter, eventually leading to his expulsion.

Salman supported Proposition 205 in 2016, which would legalize recreational use of marijuana for those 21 and older. Salman also supports public education, immigration reform, reproductive rights and LGBTQ equality.

Recognition
Salman was recognized as 2018 Best Politician by Phoenix New Times and named by The Arizona Republic's top ten newsmakers to watch in 2019. Salman and state senator Juan Mendez received Phoenix New Time's 2017 Best Power Couple. She was also awarded the City of Tempe's MLK Diversity Award in 2016.

References

External links

 Official page at the Arizona State Legislature
 Profile at Vote Smart
 Biography at Ballotpedia
 Financial information (state office) at OpenSecrets

1989 births
21st-century American politicians
21st-century American women politicians
American atheists
American people of German descent
American politicians of Mexican descent
American politicians of Palestinian descent
Arizona State University alumni
Democratic Party members of the Arizona House of Representatives
Living people